Shahad Mubarak (born 1960) is an Emirati athlete. He competed in the men's long jump at the 1984 Summer Olympics.

References

1960 births
Living people
Athletes (track and field) at the 1984 Summer Olympics
Emirati male long jumpers
Olympic athletes of the United Arab Emirates
Place of birth missing (living people)